Montezuma Castle may refer to:
Montezuma Castle National Monument in Camp Verde, Arizona
Montezuma Castle (hotel), a former hotel in Montezuma, New Mexico